Fogartach Ua Cerballáin, also known in Latin as Florentius, was a medieval Irish bishop.

References

People from County Londonderry
12th-century Roman Catholic bishops in Ireland
Bishops of Cinél nEógain